Madhuca woodii is a tree in the family Sapotaceae. It is named for the botanist Geoffrey Wood.

Description
Inflorescences bear up to seven flowers.

Distribution and habitat
Madhuca woodii is endemic to Borneo. Its habitat is mixed dipterocarp forest from  altitude.

Conservation
Madhuca woodii has been assessed as vulnerable on the IUCN Red List. The species is threatened by logging and conversion of land for palm oil plantations.

References

woodii
Endemic flora of Borneo
Trees of Borneo
Plants described in 1960